Jennifer Leslie Ware is an Australian politician and a member of the Liberal Party. She was elected to  the House of Representatives in the 2022 election, gaining the New South Wales seat of Hughes.

Early life
Ware grew up in Cronulla, New South Wales, and attended South Cronulla Primary School and St George Girls High School, which her mother and grandmother had previously attended. She has one sister.

Legal career
In her legal practice, Ware's focus was planning and environmental law, moving from private law firms to the government sector in 2013, when Ware became legal counsel for Hurstville City Council and later, Georges River Council.

Political career
Ware joined the Liberal Party in 2002 and was a long time member before leaving the party and rejoining in 2021. After the local preselection ballot was cancelled with some controversy, Ware was selected "by a committee comprising Prime Minister Scott Morrison, Premier Dominic Perrottet and former federal Liberal Party president Chris McDiven" and announced on 2 April 2022 as the Liberal candidate for the 2022 Australian federal election. She was backed by the moderate faction, of which she is a member.  Liberal Party members who endorsed her included the former Member for Hughes, Danna Vale, Member for Cronulla Mark Speakman and Member for Heathcote, Lee Evans.  Ware was inspired to run by Danna Vale's record of advocacy for the people of Hughes, and Ware furthermore described the people of Hughes as Menzies' "Forgotten People". Ware was elected to the House of Representatives in the 2022 election, gaining the New South Wales seat of Hughes from incumbent Craig Kelly of the UAP (former Liberal party member) with a swing of –9.3% against the Liberal party on first preferences and –2.79% on the two-candidate preferred count.  

Ware has been a member of the House Standing Committee on Health, Aged Care & Sport, House Standing Committee on Social Policy & Legal Affairs and Joint Standing Committee on the National Disability Insurance Scheme since August 2022.

Political views
Ware wrote to the Sydney Morning Herald in 2001, praising Pauline Hanson for being in touch with what was "causing Australians the most angst: the BAS (business activity statement), illegal boat people, road funding, competition policy, health, and education", furthermore describing John Howard and Kim Beazley as "out of touch".  When approached about these comments in the lead up to the 2022 election, Ware said that they reflected her frustrations at the time, noting that she had joined the Liberal Party and had been advocating for the important issues since.

During the 2022 election campaign, Ware stated that she had played softball with and against transgender women, and disagreed with Katherine Deves' views on transgender women.

Ware supports the use of nuclear power in Australia.

Ware participates in the Parliamentary Friends of Dementia, the Parliamentary Friends of Israel, the Parliamentary Friends of Nuclear Industries, the Parliamentary Friends of Organ Donation and the Parliamentary Friends of Suicide Prevention.

Personal life
Ware lives in Gymea Bay with her husband and two sons, and has done volunteer work with the Sylvanvale Foundation (a disability support organisation) and as President of the Gymea Bay P&C.  Ware's husband, Mike, is a sales rep.  The couple married in 1999.  As of 2021, Ware was the part-owner of three properties.

References

External links
Ms Jenny Ware on Parliament of Australia

Profile at TheyVoteForYou.org.au
Official website

                   

Living people
Liberal Party of Australia members of the Parliament of Australia
Members of the Australian House of Representatives for Hughes
Members of the Australian House of Representatives
Women members of the Australian House of Representatives
Australian solicitors
People from the Sutherland Shire
21st-century Australian politicians
21st-century Australian women politicians
Year of birth missing (living people)